Zhang Jixin (1874–1952) was a Chinese calligrapher and politician of the Republic of China. He was born in Tieling in modern Liaoning. He was the 13th mayor of Beijing as a member of the Beiyang government.

Bibliography
 
 
 
 「義達里：婉容外祖父的貝勒府」『北京青年報』2006年10月24日。

1874 births
1952 deaths
Republic of China politicians from Liaoning
Republic of China calligraphers
Mayors of Beijing
Politicians from Tieling
Qing dynasty people
Artists from Liaoning